Enchelurus is an extinct genus of prehistoric bony fish that lived from the Cenomanian to Campanian.

References

Late Cretaceous fish
Prehistoric bony fish genera